Anatoly Nikolayevich Kvochur (born 16 April 1952) is a Soviet and Russian test pilot. Honoured Test Pilot of the USSR (1990) and Hero of the Russian Federation (1992).

Biography

Anatoly Kvochur was born on April 16, 1952, in the village of Mazurovka, Mohyliv-Podilskyi in the Vinnytsia Oblast of Ukrainian Soviet Socialist Republic.

He studied at the V. M. Komarov Higher Military Flying School at Yeysk, graduating in 1973. He began service as a pilot in the Group of Soviet Forces in Germany. He served for two years before he was discharged from the Soviet Armed Forces in 1977 with a recommendation for admittance to the Fedotov Test Pilot School. He graduated from the school in 1978. From 1978 to 1981 he worked as a test pilot at Komsomolsk-on-Amur, testing Su-17 aircraft and its modifications. He also studied further at the Moscow Aviation Institute, from whence he graduated in 1981.

He was transferred to the Mikoyan Design Bureau where he participated in the testing of more than 80 types of aircraft, including MiG-21, MiG-23, MiG-27, MiG-29, MiG-31, as well as air-to-air and air-to-surface missiles. Since then he has appeared in numerous international air shows, showcasing Russian aircraft.

In 1995 Kvochur participated in a very long range flight demonstration of Su-27PD and Su-27PU Flankers featuring an inflight refueling probe. He led an aerobatic team, known as the Test Pilots Team (Lyotchiki-Ispyttahteli), which also included the pilots Vladimir Loginovsky and Alexander Garnaev.

Paris Air Show incident
Kvochur was involved in an airshow accident on 8 June 1989 at the Paris Air Show. He was flying a single-seater Mikoyan MiG-29 Fulcrum 'Blue 303', the latest fighter aircraft of the Soviet Union at the time. While executing a low-speed, high-angle attack portion of his routine, a bird was sucked into the turbofan of his right engine (a bird strike), causing the engine to burst into flames. Kvochur immediately turned the remaining engine to full afterburner. Despite his efforts, the stricken aircraft went into a steep dive. Kvochur managed to steer the MiG away from the crowd and eject 2.5 seconds before impact. The incident was caught on video and is featured on the reality television series World's Most Amazing Videos. 

The aircraft Kvochur was in, had a Zvezda K-36D ejection seat at that time. The same ejection seat also helped save the lives of the pilots of two MiG-29s that collided mid-air at the Royal International Air Tattoo four years later, on 24 July 1993, and the pilot and navigator of a Sukhoi Su-30 that crashed from a tail-strike at the Paris Air Show on 12 June 1999 (which was also captured on video).

Awards and recognition
Order of the Red Banner of Labour (1988)
Honoured Test Pilot of the USSR (8 August 1990)
Hero of the Russian Federation (17 November 1992)
Order "For Merit to the Fatherland", 3rd class (15 January 1998)

References

1952 births
Living people
People from Vinnytsia Oblast
Fedotov TPS alumni
Gromov Flight Research Institute employees
Moscow Aviation Institute alumni
Heroes of the Russian Federation
Recipients of the Order "For Merit to the Fatherland", 3rd class
Recipients of the Order of the Red Banner of Labour
Aerobatic pilots
Russian aviators
Russian test pilots
Soviet Air Force officers
Soviet test pilots